The fall of man, the fall of Adam, or simply the Fall, is a term used in Christianity to describe the transition of the first man and woman from a state of innocent obedience to God to a state of guilty disobedience. The doctrine of the Fall comes from a biblical interpretation of Genesis, chapters 1–3. At first, Adam and Eve lived with God in the Garden of Eden, but the serpent tempted them into eating the fruit from the tree of knowledge of good and evil, which God had forbidden. After doing so, they became ashamed of their nakedness and God expelled them from the Garden to prevent them from eating from the tree of life and becoming immortal.

In mainstream (Nicene) Christianity, the doctrine of the Fall is closely related to that of original sin or ancestral sin. They believe that the Fall brought sin into the world, corrupting the entire natural world, including human nature, causing all humans to be born into original sin, a state from which they cannot attain eternal life without the grace of God. The Eastern Orthodox Church accepts the concept of the Fall but rejects the idea that the guilt of original sin is passed down through generations, based in part on the passage Ezekiel 18:20 that says a son is not guilty of the sins of his father. Calvinist Protestants believe that Jesus gave his life as a sacrifice for the elect, so they may be redeemed from their sin. Lapsarianism, understanding the logical order of God's decrees in relation to the Fall, is divided by some Calvinists into supralapsarian (prelapsarian, pre-lapsarian or antelapsarian, before the Fall) and infralapsarian (sublapsarian or postlapsarian, after the Fall).

The narrative of the Garden of Eden and the fall of humankind constitute a mythological tradition shared by all the Abrahamic religions, with a presentation more or less symbolic of Judeo-Christian morals and religious beliefs, which had an overwhelming impact on human sexuality, gender roles, and sex differences both in the Western and Islamic civilizations. Unlike Christianity, the other major Abrahamic religions, Judaism and Islam, do not have a concept of "original sin", and instead have developed varying other interpretations of the Eden narrative.

Genesis 3

The doctrine of the fall of man is extrapolated from the traditional Christian exegesis of Genesis 3. According to the biblical narrative, God created Adam and Eve, the first man and woman in the chronology of the Bible. God places them in the Garden of Eden and forbids them to eat fruit from the tree of the knowledge of good and evil. The serpent tempts Eve to eat fruit from the forbidden tree, which she shares with Adam, and they immediately become ashamed of their nakedness. Subsequently, God banishes Adam and Eve from the Garden of Eden, condemns Adam to work in order to get what he needs to live and condemns Eve to give birth in pain, and places cherubim to guard the entrance, so that Adam and Eve will never eat from the "tree of life".

The Book of Jubilees, an apocryphal Jewish work written during the Second Temple period, gives time frames for the events that led to the fall of man by stating that the serpent convinced Eve to eat the fruit on the 17th day, of the 2nd month, in the 8th year after Adam's creation (3:17). It also states that they were removed from the Garden on the new moon of the 4th month of that year (3:33).

Traditional interpretations

Immortality

Christian exegetes of Genesis 2:17 ("for in the day that you eat of it you shall die") have applied the day-year principle to explain how Adam died within a day. Psalms 90:4, 2 Peter 3:8, and Jubilees 4:29–31 explain that, to God, one day is equivalent to a thousand years and thus Adam died within that same "day". The Greek Septuagint, on the other hand, has "day" translated into the Greek word for a twenty-four-hour period.

According to the Genesis narrative, during the antediluvian age, human longevity approached a millennium, such as the case of Adam who lived 930 years. Thus, to "die" has been interpreted as to become mortal. However, the grammar does not support this reading, nor does the narrative: Adam and Eve are expelled from the Garden lest they eat of the second tree, the tree of life, and gain immortality.

Original sin

The Catechism of the Catholic Church says: "The account of the fall in Genesis 3 uses figurative language, but affirms [...] that the whole of human history is marked by the original fault freely committed by our first parents." St Bede and others, especially Thomas Aquinas, said that the fall of Adam and Eve brought "four wounds" to human nature. They are original sin (lack of sanctifying grace and original justice), concupiscence (the soul's passions are no longer ordered perfectly to the soul's intellect), physical frailty and death, and darkened intellect and ignorance. These negated or diminished the gifts of God to Adam and Eve of original justice or sanctifying grace, integrity, immortality and infused knowledge. This first sin was "transmitted" by Adam and Eve to all of their descendants as original sin, causing humans to be "subject to ignorance, suffering and the dominion of death, and inclined to sin."

In the light of modern scripture scholarship, the future Pope Benedict XVI stated in 1986 that: "In the Genesis story [...] sin is not spoken of in general as an abstract possibility but as a deed, as the sin of a particular person, Adam, who stands at the origin of humankind and with whom the history of sin begins. The account tells us that sin begets sin, and that therefore all the sins of history are interlinked. Theology refers to this state of affairs by the certainly misleading and imprecise term 'original sin.'" Although the state of corruption, inherited by humans after the primaeval event of original sin, is clearly called guilt or sin, it is understood as a sin acquired by the unity of all humans in Adam rather than a personal responsibility of humanity. In the Catechism of the Catholic Church, even children partake in the effects of the sin of Adam, but not in the responsibility of original sin, as sin is always a personal act. Baptism is considered to erase original sin, though the effects on human nature remain, and for this reason, the Catholic Church baptizes even infants who have not committed any personal sin.

Eastern Orthodox Christianity rejects the idea that the guilt of original sin is passed down through generations. It bases its teaching in part on Ezekiel 18:20 that says a son is not guilty of the sins of his father. The Church teaches that, in addition to their conscience and tendency to do good, men and women are born with a tendency to sin due to the fallen condition of the world. It follows Maximus the Confessor and others in characterising the change in human nature as the introduction of a "deliberative will" in opposition to the "natural will" created by God which tends toward the good. Thus, according to Paul the Apostle in his epistle to the Romans, non-Christians can still act according to their conscience.

Eastern Orthodoxy believes that, while everyone bears the consequences of the first sin (that is, death), only Adam and Eve are guilty of that sin. Adam's sin is not comprehended only as disobedience to God's commandment, but as a change in man's hierarchy of values from theocentricism to anthropocentrism, driven by the object of his lust, outside of God, in this case the tree which was seen to be "good for food", and something "to be desired" (see also theosis, seeking union with God).

Meta-historical fall

The biblical fall of man is also understood by some Christians (especially those in the Eastern Orthodox tradition) as a reality outside of empirical history that effects the entire history of the universe. This concept of a meta-historical fall (also called metaphysical, supramundane, or atemporal) has been most recently expounded by the Orthodox theologians David Bentley Hart, John Behr, and Sergei Bulgakov, but it has roots in the writings of several early church fathers, especially Origen and Maximus the Confessor. Bulgakov writes in his 1939 book The Bride of the Lamb translated by Boris Jakim (Wm. B. Eerdmans, 2001):

Empirical history begins precisely with the fall, which is its starting premise. But this beginning of history lies beyond empirical being and cannot be included in its chronology. ...[With the] narrative in Genesis 3, ...an event is described that lies beyond our history, although at its boundary. Being connected with our history, this event inwardly permeates it.

David Bentley Hart has written about this concept of an atemporal fall in his 2005 book The Doors of the Sea as well as in his essay "The Devil’s March: Creatio ex Nihilo, the Problem of Evil, and a Few Dostoyevskian Meditations" (from his 2020 book Theological Territories).

Subordination
Traditionally, women have received the major blame for the Fall of humanity. The subordination exegesis is that the natural consequences of sin entering the human race, was prophesied by God when the phrase was made: the husband "will rule over you". This interpretation is reinforced by comments in the First Epistle to Timothy, where the author gives a rationale for directing that a woman (NIV: possibly "wife"):

Therefore, some interpretations of these passages from Genesis 3 and 1 Timothy 2 have developed a view that women are considered as bearers of Eve's guilt and that the woman's conduct in the fall is the primary reason for her universal, timeless, subordinate relationship to the man.

Alternatively, Richard and Catherine Clark Kroeger argue that "there is a serious theological contradiction in telling a woman that when she comes to faith in Christ, her personal sins are forgiven but she must continue to be punished for the sin of Eve." They maintain that judgmental comments against women in reference to Eve are a "dangerous interpretation, in terms both of biblical theology and of the call to Christian commitment". They reason that "if the Apostle Paul was forgiven for what he did ignorantly in unbelief", including persecuting and murdering Christians, "and thereafter was given a ministry, why would the same forgiveness and ministry be denied women" (for the sins of their foremother, Eve). Addressing that, the Kroegers conclude that Paul was referring to the promise of Genesis 3:15 that through the defeat of Satan on the cross of Jesus Christ, the woman's child (Jesus) would crush the serpent's head, but the serpent would only bruise the heel of her child. Moreover, many scholars suggest that the concept of inherited guilt in Christianity is a controversial subject at best, and must be treated with care.

Agricultural revolution

Authors such as Isaac Asimov, Daniel Hillel, and Daniel Quinn suggest that some of the Genesis 3 narrative's symbolism may correlate to the experience of the agricultural revolution. "The expulsion from the Garden of Eden is a folk memory of the beginning of agriculture. With that transition, humans no longer dwelled idyllically in a parkland, feeding on wild fruits or animals, but had begun the toilsome cultivation of cereals." The serpent of the Genesis narrative may represent seasonal changes and renewal, as with the symbolism of Sumerian, Egyptian, and other creation myths. In Mesoamerican creation myths, Quetzalcoatl, a feathered serpent agricultural deity, is associated with learning as well as renewal. The leading role of Eve in the Genesis narrative may be attributed to the interest of Neolithic women in shifting away from gatherer life in favor of raising crops. Women also may have taken the role of organizers in early farming settlements, thus effectively leading the shift to agrarian society. Though these settlements may have been relatively egalitarian compared to more modern societies, the Genesis narrative may be interpreted as mourning the hunter-gatherer life as a paradise lost.

Other interpretations

Gnosticism

Gnosticism originated in the late 1st century CE in non-rabbinical Jewish and early Christian sects. In the formation of Christianity, various sectarian groups, labeled "gnostics" by their opponents, emphasised spiritual knowledge (gnosis) of the divine spark within, over faith (pistis) in the teachings and traditions of the various communities of Christians. Gnosticism presents a distinction between the highest, unknowable God, and the Demiurge, "creator" of the material universe. The Gnostics considered the most essential part of the process of salvation to be this personal knowledge, in contrast to faith as an outlook in their worldview along with faith in the ecclesiastical authority.

In Gnosticism, the biblical serpent in the Garden of Eden was praised and thanked for bringing knowledge (gnosis) to Adam and Eve and thereby freeing them from the malevolent Demiurge's control. Gnostic Christian doctrines rely on a dualistic cosmology that implies the eternal conflict between good and evil, and a conception of the serpent as the liberating savior and bestower of knowledge to humankind opposed to the Demiurge or creator god, identified with the Hebrew God of the Old Testament. Gnostic Christians considered the Hebrew God of the Old Testament as the evil, false god and creator of the material universe, and the Unknown God of the Gospel, the father of Jesus Christ and creator of the spiritual world, as the true, good God. In the Archontic, Sethian, and Ophite systems, Yaldabaoth (Yahweh) is regarded as the malevolent Demiurge and false god of the Old Testament who generated the material universe and keeps the souls trapped in physical bodies, imprisoned in the world full of pain and suffering that he created.

However, not all Gnostic movements regarded the creator of the material universe as inherently evil or malevolent. For instance, Valentinians believed that the Demiurge is merely an ignorant and incompetent creator, trying to fashion the world as good as he can, but lacking the proper power to maintain its goodness. All Gnostics were regarded as heretics by the proto-orthodox Early Church Fathers.

Islam

In Islam, it is believed that Adam and Eve were misled by Iblīs (otherwise referred to as), who tempted them with the promise of immortality and a kingdom that never decays, saying: "Your Lord only forbade you this tree, lest ye should become angels or such beings as live forever". Adam and Eve had been previously warned of Shayṭān's scheming against them, and had been commanded by God to avoid the tree of knowledge that Shayṭān referred to. Although God had reminded them that there was enough provision for them "not to go hungry nor to go naked, nor to suffer from thirst, nor from the sun's heat", they ultimately gave in to Shayṭān's temptation and partook of the tree anyway. Following this sin, their "nakedness appeared to them: they began to sew together, for their covering, leaves from the Garden", and were subsequently sent down from Paradise onto the Earth with "enmity one to another". However, God also gave them the assurance that "when there come unto you from Me a guidance, then whoso followeth My guidance, he will not go astray nor come to grief."

Muslim scholars can be divided into two groups regarding the reason behind Adam's fall: the first point of view argues that Adam sinned out of his own free will, and only became a prophet later, after he was cast out of paradise and asked for forgiveness. They adhere to the doctrine according to which infallibility (‘iṣmah) only applies to prophets after they were sent to a mission. According to the second point of view, Adam was predestined by God's will to eat from the forbidden tree, because God planned to set Adam and his progeny on Earth from the beginning and thus installed Adam's fall. For this reason, many Muslim exegetes do not regard Adam and Eve's expulsion from paradise as a punishment for disobedience or a result from abused free will on their part, but rather as part of God's wisdom (ḥikmah) and plan for humanity to experience the full range of his attributes, his love, forgiveness, and power to his creation. By their former abode in paradise, they can hope for return during their lifetime. Unlike Iblīs (al-Shayṭān), Adam asked for forgiveness for his transgression, despite God being the ultimate cause of his Fall. For that reason, God bestowed mercy upon Adam and his children. Some Muslim scholars view Adam as an image for his descendants: humans sin, become aware of it, repent for their transgressions (tawba), and return back to God. According to this interpretation, Adam embodies humanity and his Fall shows humans how to act whenever they sin.

Within the Shīʿīte branch of Islam, Muslim followers of the Alawite sect believe that their souls were once luminous stars worshipping ʿAlī ibn Abī Ṭālib in a world of light, but that upon committing sins of pride they were banished from their former state and forced to transmigrate in the world of matter.

Zoroastrianism
In classic Zoroastrianism, humanity is created to withstand the forces of decay and destruction through good thoughts, words and deeds. Failure to do so actively leads to misery for the individual and for his family. This is also the moral of many of the stories of the Shahnameh, the key text of Persian mythology.

Literature and art

In William Shakespeare's Henry V (1599), the King describes the betrayal of Lord Scroop – a friend since childhood – as being "like another fall of man", referring to the loss of his own faith and innocence the treason has caused.

In the novel Perelandra (1943) by C. S. Lewis, the theme of the fall is explored in the context of a new Garden of Eden with a new, green-skinned Adam and Eve on the planet Venus, and with the protagonist  the Cambridge scholar Dr. Ransom  transported there and given the mission of thwarting Satan and preventing a new fall.

In the novel The Fall (1956) by Albert Camus, the theme of the fall is enunciated through the first-person account given in post-war Amsterdam, in a bar called "Mexico City." Confessing to an acquaintance, the protagonist, Jean-Baptiste Clamence, describes the haunting consequence of his refusal to rescue a woman who had jumped from a bridge to her death. The dilemmas of modern Western conscience and the sacramental themes of baptism and grace are explored.

J. R. R. Tolkien included as a note to his comments about the Dialogue of Finrod and Andreth (published posthumously in 1993) the Tale of Adanel that is a reimagining of the fall of man inside his Middle-earth's mythos. The story presented Melkor seducing the first Men by making them worship him instead of Eru Ilúvatar, leading to the loss of the "Edenic" condition of the human race. The story is part of Morgoth's Ring.

In both Daniel Quinn's Ishmael (1992) and The Story of B (1996) novels, it is proposed that the story of the fall of man was first thought up by another culture watching the development of the now-dominant totalitarian agriculturalist culture.

In Philip Pullman's His Dark Materials series (1995, 1997, 2000), the fall is presented in a positive light, as it is the moment at which human beings achieve self-awareness, knowledge, and freedom. Pullman believes that it is not worth being innocent if the price is ignorance.

The novel Lord of the Flies explores the fall of man. The storyline depicts young, innocent children who turn into savages when they are stranded on a desert island. Lord of the Flies was originally named Strangers from Within, also showing his views of human nature.

The theme is also frequently depicted in historical European art. Lucas van Leyden, a Dutch engraver and painter during the Renaissance period, created several different woodcuts featuring Adam and Eve (two were part of his Power of Women series).

See also

 Book of the Heavenly Cow
 Deal with the Devil
 Ningishzida
 Paradise Lost by John Milton

References

Bibliography

Further reading
 Beynen, G. Koolemans, Animal Language in the Garden of Eden: Folktale Elements in Genesis in Signifying Animals: Human Meaning in the Natural World, Roy G. Willis, ed., (London: Routledge, 1994), 39–50.
 Thompson, William Irwin, The Time Falling Bodies Take to Light: Mythology, Sexuality and the Origins of Culture, 1981, 2001

External links

 
 The Fall, BBC Radio 4 discussion with Martin Palmer, Griselda Pollock & John Carey (In Our Time, Apr. 8, 2004)

Bereshit (parashah)
Biblical phrases
Book of Genesis
Christian mythology
Christian terminology
Christian theology of the Bible
Garden of Eden
Gnosticism
Islamic mythology
Jewish mythology
Judeo-Christian topics
Mormon cosmology
Religious concepts related with Adam and Eve
Systematic theology